James William Brown  (1897–1958) was an English physician, pathologist, and cardiologist.
 

After demobilisation he entered the Middlesex Hospital Medical School and qualified MRCS, LRCP in 1923. He graduated MB BS (Lond.) in 1924 and MD (Lond.) in 1928. In 1924 he joined the general practice of Joshua Williamson (b. 1874), who was a general practitioner and also held an appointment as honorary surgeon to Grimsby Hospital. At the Grimsby Hospital, Brown became honorary pathologist and then honorary physician. He qualified MRCP in 1930 and was elected FRCP in 1942. He was a general practitioner, in partnership with Williamson (who became his father-in-law), at Cleethorpes from 1924 to 1931 and at Grimsby from 1931 to 1938. In 1938 he abandoned general practice to become a consultant physician, and later cardiologist, to the Grimsby Hospital and the Scunthorpe General Hospital. 

In 1930 he joined David Clark Muir in running a paediatric heart clinic at Hull. The clinic developed into a referral centre for congenital heart disease. Brown wrote with Evan Bedford the section on congenital heart disease in volume 6 of the British Encyclopaedia of Medical Practice (1937, London, Butterworth & Co., Ltd.). Brown's book Congenital Heart Disease (1939) was of some importance in the development of cardiac surgery. In 1943 he gave the Bradshaw Lecture. He was a member of the editorial board of the British Heart Journal.

In Grimsby in 1925 Brown married Margaret J. Williamson. They had a son and a daughter.

Selected publications
with D. C. Muir: 
with D. C. Muir: 
with D. C. Muir: 
with Frank Hampson: 
with William Whitaker and Donald Heath: 
with Donald Heath and William Whitaker: 
with Donald Heath and William Whitaker: 
with Donald Heath, Thomas L. Morris, and William Whitaker: 
with Donald Heath and William Whitaker:

References

1897 births
1958 deaths
20th-century British medical doctors
People educated at Sidcot School
British cardiologists
Fellows of the Royal College of Physicians
People associated with the Friends' Ambulance Unit
Recipients of the Croix de Guerre 1914–1918 (France)